Arkivet (Eng: "The Archive") was a Norwegian 10 episode drama/comedy series set in a hospital archive. The series was compared with The Office by some critics due to the "mockumentary" style but was actually developed (but not screened) before the British hit show.

The first episode was watched by 74,000 viewers, but the rest of the series had an average of only 44,000 viewers.

See also
Etaten, another series inspired by The Office

External links
 Official Site (Norwegian)
 Stills from the series

Norwegian comedy television series
TV3 (Norway) original programming
2003 Norwegian television series debuts
2006 Norwegian television series endings